Lily Morgan is an American politician serving as a Republican member of the Oregon House of Representatives.

Political career 
In October 2021, Morgan signed a letter along with other Republican politicians from around the nation calling for an audit of the 2020 election in all states and the elimination of voter rolls in every state. The letter also claimed that the Arizona audit found evidence of fraud.

References 

Living people
Republican Party members of the Oregon House of Representatives
21st-century American women politicians
21st-century American politicians
Women state legislators in Oregon
Year of birth missing (living people)